Sérgio dos Santos Gil (22 July 1970 – 9 July 1989) was a Brazilian footballer. He was the brother of Tonho Gil.

Death
Sérgio Gil died in a car accident after a head-on collision with another vehicle on the Régis Bittencourt highway.

Career statistics

Club

Notes

References

1970 births
1989 deaths
Brazilian footballers
Brazil youth international footballers
Association football midfielders
Figueirense FC players
Sport Club Corinthians Paulista players
Road incident deaths in Brazil
Sportspeople from Florianópolis